Callabraxas is a genus of moths in the family Geometridae.

Species
 Callabraxas amanda Butler, 1880
 Callabraxas compositata (Guenée, 1857)
 Callabraxas convexa (Wileman, 1911)
 Callabraxas fabiolaria (Oberthür, 1884)
 Callabraxas intersectaria (Leech, 1897)
 Callabraxas liva (Xue, 1990)
 Callabraxas ludovicaria (Oberthür, 1880)
 Callabraxas nigritella (Xue, 1992)
 Callabraxas plurilineata (Walker, 1862)
 Callabraxas trigoniplaga (Hampson, 1895)

References
 Callabraxas at Markku Savela's Lepidoptera and Some Other Life Forms
 Natural History Museum Lepidoptera genus database

Cidariini
Geometridae genera